Gary DeWayne Jones (born November 30, 1967) is a former professional American football player who played safety for six seasons for the Pittsburgh Steelers (1990–1994) and the New York Jets (1995–1996).

1967 births
Living people
People from San Augustine, Texas
American football safeties
Texas A&M Aggies football players
Pittsburgh Steelers players
New York Jets players
Ed Block Courage Award recipients